Red Grooms: Sunflower in a Hothouse is a 1986 short film biography of the Nashville-born artist Red Grooms. It was written by Tom Neff, co-directed by Neff and Louise LeQuire, and produced by Neff and Madeline Bell. The film was funded by the Tennessee State Museum and was nominated for an Academy Award for Documentary Short Subject.

Synopsis
A glimpse of Red and reflection of his humor an humanism on his artwork.

Interviews
 Red Grooms
 Barbara Haskell - curator at the Whitney Museum of American Art

Awards
Wins
 CINE: CINE Golden Eagle, Documentary; 1986.

Nominations
 Academy Awards: Oscar, Best Documentary, Short Subjects, Tom Neff and Madeline Bell; 1987.

Notes

External links
 Tom Neff official web site (see Films for film clip)
 
 AllMovie

1986 films
1980s short documentary films
American short documentary films
Documentary films about visual artists
Films directed by Tom Neff
American independent films
1986 independent films
1980s English-language films
1980s American films